Paul Edgar Philippe Martin  (born August 28, 1938), also known as Paul Martin Jr., is a Canadian lawyer and politician who served as the 21st prime minister of Canada and the leader of the Liberal Party of Canada from 2003 to 2006.

The son of former secretary of state for external affairs Paul Martin Sr., Martin was a lawyer from Ontario before he became president and the chief executive officer of Canada Steamship Lines in 1973. He held that position until his election as a member of Parliament for the Montreal riding of LaSalle—Émard in 1988. Martin unsuccessfully ran for leader of the Liberal Party in 1990, losing to Jean Chrétien. Martin would become Chrétien's longtime rival for the leadership of the party, though was appointed his minister of finance after the Liberal victory in the 1993 federal election. Martin oversaw many changes in the financial structure of the Canadian government, and his policies had a direct effect on eliminating the country's chronic fiscal deficit by reforming various programs including social services.

In 2002, Martin resigned as finance minister when the tension with Chrétien reached its peak. He initially prepared to challenge Chrétien's leadership, though Chrétien announced his intention of retiring, triggering the November 2003 leadership election. Martin won the leadership easily and in the following month, succeeded Chrétien as prime minister. In the 2004 federal election, the Liberal Party retained power, although only as a minority government due to the Chrétien government's sponsorship scandal. During his tenure, Martin's government signed the Kelowna Accord to improve living conditions for indigenous peoples, reached an agreement with the provinces on increased funding for healthcare, and legalized same-sex marriage. In 2005, the opposition parties in the House of Commons passed a motion of no confidence contending that Martin's government was corrupt, as a result of new details from the sponsorship scandal that were released through the Gomery Report, triggering the 2006 federal election. Martin was defeated by the newly unified Conservative Party led by Stephen Harper, ending over 12 years of Liberal rule. Shortly after, Martin stepped down as leader of the Liberals and declined to seek re-election in 2008. Evaluations of Martin's prime ministership have been mixed, whereas his tenure as finance minister is viewed more favourably.

Now seen as a global diplomat, Martin continues to contribute on the international arena through a variety of initiatives such as Incentives for Global Health, the not-for-profit behind the Health Impact Fund, where he serves as a member of the advisory board. He also sits as an advisor to Canada's Ecofiscal Commission.

Early life
Martin was born at Hôtel-Dieu of St. Joseph Hospital in Windsor, Ontario, and grew up in Windsor and Ottawa. His father, Paul Martin Sr., a Franco-Ontarian of Irish and French descent, served 33 years as a member of the House of Commons of Canada, and was a Cabinet minister in the Liberal governments of Prime Ministers W. L. Mackenzie King, Louis St. Laurent, Lester B. Pearson, and Pierre E. Trudeau. His mother, Eleanor "Nell" Alice (née Adams), was of Scottish and  Irish descent. He had one sister, Mary-Anne Bellamy, who was diagnosed with Crohn's disease at a young age. She died on July 20, 2011. Martin contracted polio in 1946 at the age of eight (like his father, who contracted the disease in 1907). To give him the opportunity to improve his French, his parents enrolled him in a private French-language middle school, École Garneau, in Ottawa.

Martin then briefly attended the University of Ottawa before transferring and graduating from St. Michael's College at the University of Toronto with a B.A. in history and philosophy in 1961. He was a member of the U of T Young Liberals during his time at the University of Toronto. He then attended the University of Toronto Faculty of Law, where he received an LL.B. in 1964. He was called to the Ontario bar in 1966.

On September 11, 1965, Martin married Sheila Ann Cowan, with whom he has three sons: Paul, Jamie and David.

Business career

Board of directors
In 1969, Power Corporation took a controlling share in Canada Steamship Lines. On December 2, 1970, Paul Martin, the 32-year-old executive assistant to Power Corporation Chief Executive Officer (CEO) Maurice Strong, was appointed to the CSL board of directors. In 1971, CSL minority shareholders sold outstanding shares to Power Corporation, making CSL a Power Corporation subsidiary.

Presidency
CSL suffered losses in 1972 when forced to cover unexpected cost overruns in the construction of three 80,000-ton ocean-going tankers at Davie Shipbuilding. On November 22, 1973, Martin was appointed president and CEO of the CSL Group. In 1974, CSL earnings were further hurt by an eight-week strike on the Great Lakes.

In 1976, Power Corporation reversed itself and took over the investment portfolio that had been sold to CSL five years earlier. CSL reverted to an operating division of Power Corporation.

Early political career (1988–1993)

In 1988, Martin was elected as the Member of Parliament (MP) for the southwestern Montreal riding of LaSalle-Émard. He was re-elected without much difficulty at every election until he retired from politics.

In 1984, the Liberal Party was defeated under the leadership of John Turner, falling to just 40 seats. A group of young Liberals approached Martin as a possible candidate to replace Turner, and while he did not take part in an attempt to overthrow Turner, he did prepare to succeed him in the leadership should the position open.

Martin was a candidate at the 1990 Liberal Party of Canada leadership election, losing to Jean Chrétien in a bitter race that resulted in lasting animosity between the two men and their supporters. A key moment in that race took place at an all-candidates debate in Montreal, where the discussion quickly turned to the Meech Lake Accord. Martin, favouring Meech, attempted to force Chrétien to abandon his nuanced position on the deal and declare for or against it. When Chrétien refused to endorse the deal, young Liberal delegates crowding the hall began to chant "vendu" ("sellout" in French) and "Judas" at Chrétien. Chrétien was upset at the response from the floor and another similar outburst by Martin supporters at the convention when Chrétien accepted the party leadership. Jean Lapierre and his supporters, who supported Martin, wore black armbands at the convention to protest Chrétien's victory. The Meech Lake accord was officially defeated just one day before the Liberal leadership was to be decided. In the House of Commons, Lapierre then crossed the floor to the newly formed Bloc Québécois.

After the leadership convention, Martin co-authored the election platform Creating Opportunity, colloquially known as the Red Book. The Liberal Party won a landslide majority government in the 1993 election.

Finance Minister (1993–2002)
After the Liberals formed the government, Martin was chosen as minister of finance by Prime Minister Chrétien. At the time, Canada had one of the highest budgetary deficits of the G7 countries. Standard & Poor's had lowered its rating on Canada's foreign-denominated government debt from AAA to AA-plus in 1992, and in 1994, Moody's lowered its rating on Canada's foreign currency debt from Aaa to Aa1, partly due to Canada's growing public debt. In his debut as finance minister, Martin made huge budget cuts that almost ground economic growth to a halt, scaling down government to 1951 levels. In 1994–96, when these cuts were made, economic growth decreased by 3.5 percentage points, according to a study by CIBC-Wood Gundy. The resulting loss in tax revenue almost eliminated the savings made by the cuts and turned the economy away from the public sector toward the private sector. The cuts endangered the provinces' abilities to pay for social programs, health care, and public infrastructure. In response, the Bank of Canada lowered interest rates to avoid contributing to a growing recession, causing a huge spurt of economic growth and resulting increase in government revenue. In 1998, Martin introduced a balanced budget, an event that had occurred only twice in 36 years before 1997. In 2002, Moody's and Standard and Poor's restored Canada's domestic and foreign currency debt ratings to AAA.

During his tenure as finance minister, Martin was responsible for lowering Canada's debt-to-GDP ratio from a peak of 70 percent to about 50 percent in the mid-1990s. In December 2001, he was named a member of the World Economic Forum's "dream cabinet." The global business and financial body listed Martin along with United States Secretary of State Colin Powell and United Nations Secretary-General Kofi Annan as top world leaders.

Also during his tenure as finance minister, Martin coordinated a series of meetings between the finance ministers of all provinces to discuss the pending crisis in the Canada Pension Plan (CPP). Consequently, Martin oversaw the creation of a general public consultation process in February 1996 that eventually led to major structural reform of the CPP. The results of this public consultation process were collected and analyzed by the Finance department. Eventually, it led to a proposal for overhauling the CPP, which was presented to Parliament and was approved soon after, averting a pension crisis.

While Martin's record as finance minister was lauded in business and financial circles, there were undeniable costs. Some of these took the form of reduced government services, affecting the operations and achievement of the mandate of federal and provincial departments. This was probably most noticeable in health care, as major reductions in federal funding to the provinces meant significant cuts in service delivery. Martin's tactics, including those of using contributor's funds from RCMP, Military and Civil Service pension plans and Employment Insurance, created further controversy. CAW economist Jim Stanford said that a combination of a spending freeze at 1994 levels and lower interest rates would have eliminated the deficit in two years through economic growth alone, without the reduction in services.

Relations with Chrétien

Chrétien and Martin frequently clashed while in office. It was reported that Chrétien privately often condemned Martin in bitter terms and had never forgiven Martin for running against him in the Liberal leadership convention of 1990. During that bitter contest, Martin had forced Chrétien to declare his opposition to the Meech Lake Accord and, as a result, Chrétien was generally unpopular in his home province for the next decade.

Even before the Liberals' second electoral victory in the 1997 election, there was much speculation in the media and in Ottawa that Martin was after Chrétien's job and wanted to force him to retire. As the Liberals emerged with a smaller majority government after the 1997 election, it seemed unlikely that any opposition party could pose a serious challenge, but Martin began to gain support from those who began to disagree with Chrétien. Chrétien, however, resolved to stay on after the Liberals were reelected in 2000, having regained much of the ground lost in 1997. By this time, Martin had gained control of much of the party machinery.

Becoming prime minister

The conflict between the two men reached a peak in 2002. Martin left Cabinet, being replaced by John Manley as finance minister. There is some question about whether Martin resigned or Chrétien had him dismissed. Being out of Cabinet was likely a boost to Martin's campaign as he was no longer obligated to disclose his donors. Soon after, Martin declared his intention to run as leader of the Liberal Party at the next party convention. Over the summer of 2002, Martin toured the country campaigning to succeed Chrétien while his Liberal organizers prepared to challenge Chrétien's leadership during a review vote in January 2003. During the fall, Chrétien announced that he would step down in the spring of 2004 after less than half of caucus agreed to sign a commitment supporting him. The Liberal party called a leadership convention for the fall of 2003, to be held in Toronto.

Several other potential leadership contenders, such as Brian Tobin and Allan Rock, declined to enter the contest. John Manley's attacks on Martin's refusal to disclose his campaign contributors did little to dent the latter's commanding lead and Manley eventually conceded the race. This left no strong candidate for Chrétien supporters to rally around, and some of them grudgingly voted for Martin.

On September 21, 2003, Martin easily defeated his sole remaining opponent, former Deputy Prime Minister Sheila Copps, securing 93 percent of the party delegates. On November 14, 2003, he was declared the winner at the Liberal leadership convention, capturing 3,242 of 3,455 votes. He had won the leadership almost unopposed, due to his hold on the party machinery, and because Chrétien supporters did not rally around either of the leadership opponents.

Simon Fraser University professor Doug McArthur has noted that Martin's leadership campaign used aggressive tactics for the 2003 leadership convention, in attempting to end the contest before it could start by giving the impression that his bid was too strong. McArthur blamed Martin's tactics for the ongoing sag in Liberal fortunes, as it discouraged activists who were not on side.

Prime Minister (2003–2006)

Majority government and sponsorship controversy

On December 12, 2003, Martin was appointed by then Governor General Adrienne Clarkson as the 21st Prime Minister of Canada. When sworn in as prime minister, Martin held the flag that flew on Parliament Hill when the elder Martin died. Both father and son had served as Cabinet ministers and contested the Liberal leadership on multiple occasions; their attempts from 1948 to 1990 were unsuccessful. Martin's election as leader and becoming prime minister was described as fulfilling a family dream. Both also earned the honorific prefix The Right Honourable. One difference between them was that Paul Sr. was one of the most left-wing members of the party, while Paul Jr. is considered on the right-wing.

When he was sworn in, Martin's new cabinet retained only half the ministers from Chrétien's government, a noteworthy break in tradition from previous instances where a retiring prime minister handed over power to his successor as party leader. Martin and his supporters exercised control over the riding nomination process, breaking with the precedent to automatically sign the nomination papers of backbenchers and former ministers who wanted to run for reelection. While these were signs of open party infighting, this had little impact on Martin's record popularity, with several pundits suggesting that the cabinet change was meant to present a new government different from Chrétien's ten-year tenure.

Martin and the Liberals were adversely affected by a report from Auditor General Sheila Fraser on February 9, 2004, indicating that sponsorship contracts designed to increase the federal government's status in Quebec resulted in little to no work done. Many of the agencies had Liberal ties, and roughly $100 million of the $250 million in program spending went missing. The scandal hurt Martin's popularity, especially in Quebec, where Bloc Québécois leader Gilles Duceppe even accused Martin of planning to widen the St. Lawrence seaway to benefit his own Canada Steamship Lines. The scandal also cast skepticism on Martin's recommendations for Cabinet appointments, prompting speculation Martin was simply ridding the government of Chrétien's supporters to distance the Liberals from the scandal. Martin acknowledged that there was political direction but denied involvement in, or knowledge of, the sponsorship contracts. He had a judicial inquiry called to investigate what came to be known as the Sponsorship Scandal, and nominated John Gomery to head it.

During his term, Martin appeared as himself in a fictional, comedic context in several programs, including an episode of the CTV sitcom Corner Gas in 2006, and also in the CBC mockumentary series Jimmy MacDonald's Canada in 2005.

2004 federal election
The Liberals were facing a new united Conservative Party led by Stephen Harper, while the Bloc Québécois and NDP were also buoyed by the Sponsorship Scandal. Martin advised Governor General Adrienne Clarkson to call an election for June 28, 2004.

The Liberals were also hampered by their inability to raise campaign money competitively after Chrétien passed a bill in 2003 that banned corporate donations, even though the Liberals had enjoyed by far the lion's share of this funding due to the then-divided opposition parties. It has been suggested that Chrétien, who had done nothing about election financing for his 10 years in office, could be seen as the idealist as he retired, while his rival and successor Martin would have the burden of having to fight an election under the strict new rules.

An unpopular provincial budget by Liberal Premier Dalton McGuinty, who broke a pledge not to raise taxes, hurt the federal party's numbers in Ontario, as did a weak performance from Martin in the leaders' debates. The Conservatives soon took the lead, prompting some predictions of an imminent Harper government. The Liberals managed to narrow the gap and eventually regain momentum. Martin was successful in winning a plurality of seats to continue as the government, though they were now in a minority situation, the first since Joe Clark's tenure in 1979–80.

Minority government

The Martin government faced combined challenges from Quebec separatism and general hostility arising from the Sponsorship Scandal. The first test of the Liberal minority came following the Speech from the throne on October 5, 2004. The Conservatives announced plans to move an amendment to the speech. In this they were supported by the separatist Bloc Québécois and the New Democratic Party. The fall of the government was averted only after agreement on a watered-down version of the amendment.

Economic policy

Healthcare funding 

At the First Ministers' Meeting of September 13–15, 2004, Martin and the provincial premiers reached an agreement on increased funding for healthcare. This 10-year plan outlined $18 billion in increased transfers to the provinces over 6 years, notably through increases in the CHT:
 The CHT was to be increased by $3 billion in 2004-05 and $2 billion in 2005-06 ;
 A new CHT base set at $19 billion starting in 2005-06, greater than suggested in the Romanow Report ;
 An escalation factor set at 6% starting in 2006-07.

Equalization 

Martin also introduced changes to the equalization program, under which the Federal Government is constitutionally obligated to redistribute federal revenue to provinces having less ability to raise revenues through taxation than wealthier provinces. The goal is to ensure uniformity of public service provision across the nation. This was received well in "have-not" provinces, but Nova Scotia and Newfoundland and Labrador sought to retain income from natural resources on federal marine territory that would generally be taken, or 'clawed back', by the federal treasury in lieu of equalization payments. In the 2004 federal election campaign, Harper provided a written promise that Newfoundland and Labrador and Nova Scotia under a Conservative government would receive 100 percent of the revenue generated from their natural resources without an equalization clawback, a promise he reneged upon when elected Prime Minister. NDP leader Jack Layton followed suit soon after with a similar guarantee, and later Martin promised that under a Liberal government both provinces would receive the same deal, except only for oil resources. Negotiations over the agreement were harsh, with Newfoundland and Labrador Premier Danny Williams at one point ordering all Canadian flags removed from provincial government buildings in December 2004. The dispute was resolved when the federal government agreed to Martin's original campaign promise.

2005 budget 

The 2005 federal budget was presented in the House of Commons on February 23, 2005. The budget included an array of new spending for the Armed Forces, the environment and a national child-care program.

Public hearings of the Gomery Commission inquiry into the sponsorship scandal involving alleged kickbacks and "donations" from Quebec advertising agencies and corporations to Liberal Party operatives led to a drop in the Liberal Party's popularity. The security of the minority government came under fire as the Conservatives threatened to force an election by use of their "opposition day," when they get to set the Parliament's agenda. The Conservatives would use this time to hold a vote of no confidence in order to topple Martin's government. To avoid this, Martin removed all opposition days from the schedule and made a televised appearance on April 21, 2005, to attempt to gain support from the Canadian people to let the inquiry run its course before an election was called. In the rebuttal speeches by the opposition party leaders, Layton offered his party's support provided that they were given major concessions in the budget such as canceling the proposed corporate tax cuts. Days later, the Liberals took the NDP up on their offer and negotiated tax cut deferments and new spending initiatives. Among the new commitments was aid for Sudan, which Sudan's officials turned down as Martin did not consult them about it beforehand. This aid was attacked as a perceived attempt to win the vote of a single independent MP, former Liberal David Kilgour. Kilgour nevertheless voted against the government.

In May, Parliament passed a motion asking one of its committees to express a lack of confidence in the government. The Liberals dismissed this as a procedural matter, causing some to accuse them of governing unlawfully by ignoring parliamentary tradition. The Conservatives and Bloc interpreted it as a vote of no confidence, and they combined their votes to shut down the House of Commons early for two days in a row. The Speaker of the House of Commons later ruled in favour of the Liberal stance.

On May 17, 2005, MP Belinda Stronach crossed the floor from the Conservative Party and joined the Liberal Party to become Minister of Human Resources and Skills Development. Martin claimed Stronach's move was due to concerns over the direction the Conservative Party was taking; others accused Stronach of political opportunism. The event changed the balance of power in the House of Commons in favour of the government. This, and the support of independent MP Chuck Cadman, caused a tie during a May 2005 confidence vote, meaning that Peter Milliken, Speaker of the House needed to cast the deciding vote. He voted with the government, following the tradition that the Speaker votes to continue debate, and that allowed the budget to pass through the House on May 19, 2005.

Social policy

Same-sex marriage proved to be a defining issue of Martin's mandate. Martin opposed same-sex marriage in a 1999 vote on the issue along with a majority of MPs, but changed his stance on the issue in 2004, citing recent court rulings and his personal belief that same-sex marriage was primarily a human rights issue. In the midst of various court rulings in 2003 and 2004 that allowed for the legalization of same-sex marriages in seven provinces and one territory, the government proposed a bill to legalize same-sex marriage across Canada. The House of Commons passed the Civil Marriage Act in late June 2005 in a late-night, last-minute vote before Parliament closed down, the Senate passed it in July 2005, and it received Royal Assent on July 20 of the same year. This made Canada the fourth country in the world to allow same-sex marriages.

In November 2005, the Martin government reached a historic consensus with Canada's provinces, territories, First Nations, Métis and Inuit. Known as the Kelowna Accord, it aimed to eliminate the gaps between Aboriginal and non-Aboriginal Canadians in health, education, housing and economic opportunity.

Foreign relations

On February 24, 2005, Foreign Affairs Minister Pierre Pettigrew told the House of Commons that Canada would not participate in the American National Missile Defense Program, and that he expected to be consulted in the case of a missile being launched over Canadian airspace. Martin's decision met with much praise, but others saw that the government was distancing itself from the U.S. His government continued to cooperate with the United States on border control, refugee claimants, and defense, and he appointed seasoned Liberal politician Frank McKenna as Canada's ambassador to Washington.

Martin was criticized for failing to reach a foreign-aid target of 0.7 percent of GDP, most notably by Bono of Irish rock group U2 (who claimed that he was going to "kick [Martin's] butt" over the issue). Martin later responded that, in his view, many foreign leaders had made pledges that were too fanciful and that he would only commit to targets that he knew his government could be held accountable for.

Martin became involved in a diplomatic row with the United States administration after accusing, with Bill Clinton, the US of not listening to global environmental concerns. Martin rejected US Ambassador David Wilkins's rebuke and said he was standing up for Canada's interests over softwood and other issues.

Martin promoted the expansion of the G8 into a larger group of twenty nations, G20, whose inaugural chairman was himself. He also forged a closer relationship with the People's Republic of China by announcing the strategic partnership initiative during PRC President Hu Jintao's state visit to Canada in September 2005.

Appointment of Governor General
On August 4, 2005, the government announced that Martin had advised Queen Elizabeth II to appoint Michaëlle Jean as governor general. The reception to the appointment was mixed: some applauded the move, while accusations that her husband had both dined with former members of the terrorist organization FLQ and been supportive of Quebec separatism surprised others. Subsequent to her appointment, she reaffirmed her commitment to federalism and the issue died down.

Fall of government
The first volume of the Gomery Report, released on November 1, 2005, cleared Martin of any wrongdoing while placing some blame for the scandal on Chrétien for lack of oversight, although it acknowledged that Chrétien had no knowledge of the scandal. On June 26, 2008, Chrétien was cleared of all allegations of involvement in the scandal.

A Canadian judge issued a gag order that barred Canadian media from covering the hearings of the Gomery Inquiry. Despite this, leaked information circulated after being published in an American blog Captain's Quarters.

After the Gomery findings, NDP leader Jack Layton notified the Liberals of conditions for the NDP's continued support; the terms of these conditions are unclear, but the two parties were unable to come to an agreement. An opposition proposal schedule an election for February 2006 in return for passing several pieces of legislation was also unrealized. The Conservatives, supported by the other two opposition parties (the NDP and Bloc Québécois), introduced a motion of non confidence against the Martin government. The motion passed on November 28 by a count of 171–133, defeating the government, after which the Governor General issued the election writs for a vote to be held on January 23, 2006.

Some commentators described Martin's tenure as Prime Minister as unfocused and indecisive, with the Canadian correspondent of The Economist reporting that he was being called "Mr. Dithers" in Ottawa.

2006 federal election

Martin campaigned on a vision of Canada different from that of the Conservatives, centering on issues of health care, daycare, tax cutting, and national autonomy. But for much of the campaign the Liberals were on the defensive due to corruption within the party, as a result of revelations of details of the Sponsorship Scandal.

Prior to the campaign and upon dropping of the writs, opinion polling indicated the Liberals were ahead of the Conservatives by 2–10% popular support (November 30, 2005: Liberals 35%, Conservatives 30%). But the Liberal lead did not last. They did not plan much serious campaigning during December, allowing the Conservatives to take the initiative in rolling out policy ideas. Several early gaffes were picked up by an unsympathetic media. One notable gaffe was Liberal Party strategist Scott Reid's suggestion that parents might buy beer and popcorn with the Conservatives' child care subsidy, although Martin declined to apologize. Martin was also criticized for portraying himself as the defender of Canadian unity; some opponents said that the election was not a referendum while others pointed to the Sponsorship Scandal.

Near the end of December, the Liberals were rocked by a Royal Canadian Mounted Police criminal investigation into the leaking of news of a federal tax change for income trusts. This again brought the Sponsorship Scandal to public attention at a time when Martin planned to make important policy announcements. Under constant campaign pressure by all opposition parties casting Martin and the Liberals as corrupt, Liberal support fell to as low as 26% in early January 2006.

Martin did not put in a strong performance during the televised campaign debates. While appearing passionate in his message, he stuttered in making statements and appeared somewhat flustered. During one debate, Martin made a surprise pledge that he would eliminate the notwithstanding clause; the Conservatives pointed out that this was not one of the announced Liberal campaign promises.

In an attempt to sway voter sentiment in the final two weeks of the campaign, the Liberals prepared a series of attack ads. One unreleased ad was seen widely as disrespectful of the military and it not only overshadowed the other ads but also forced Martin to defend it instead of releasing new policies. During the last week, Martin was forced to defend Harper after the latter was called a separatist by Canadian Auto Workers union leader Buzz Hargrove. In another tactic similar to the 2004 campaign, Hargrove urged all progressive voters to unite under the Liberal banner in English Canada and the Bloc Québécois in Quebec to stop the Conservatives, hoping to attract voters who were leaning towards the NDP, but New Democrat leader Jack Layton responded by focusing his attacks on Liberal corruption.

In the end, the Conservatives won a plurality of support and seats, finishing 31 seats short of a majority. The Liberals held their base of support in Ontario, with 54 seats of the 103 in the province. The Liberals lost a number of seats in Quebec, winning only 13 of the 75 seats in the province, down from 21 in 2004, while the Conservatives won 10 seats there. The Liberals did not improve their standings in the Western provinces, winning only 14 of the 92 seats, the same number as in 2004.

Shortly after midnight on January 24, 2006, after it became clear that the Conservatives were on their way to a plurality, Martin conceded defeat. (Near the end of the 2004 election, Martin and Harper both pledged that they would not form a government unless they won a plurality of seats.)  Martin surprised many by announcing his resignation as party leader, saying "I will continue to represent with pride the people of LaSalle—Émard, but I will not take our party into another election as leader."

The next day, Martin officially informed Governor General Michaëlle Jean of his intention to resign as prime minister. Jean asked Harper to form a government later that day. Martin remained as prime minister until the Harper minority government was sworn on February 6, 2006.

Supreme Court appointments 
Martin chose the following jurists to be appointed as justices of the Supreme Court of Canada by the Governor General:
 Rosalie Abella (October 4, 2004 – July 1, 2021)
 Louise Charron (October 4, 2004 – August 30, 2011)

Return to the back benches (2006–2008)

Choosing not to take on the office of Leader of the Opposition, the first defeated Prime Minister who had retained his seat not to do so, Martin stepped down as parliamentary leader of his party on February 1, and the Liberal caucus appointed Bill Graham, MP for Toronto Centre and outgoing Defence Minister, as his interim successor.

Martin temporarily remained nominal Liberal party leader until March 18, 2006, when he submitted his resignation to party executives, who handed that post to Graham for the interim until that next leadership convention could be held. At the same meeting Martin tendered his resignation, the date for the leadership convention to select his successor was set for the weekend of December 2–3, 2006. According to media reports, Martin decided to move up the date of his resignation to end speculation that he might lead the Liberals into another election if Stephen Harper's minority government were to fall prior to the Liberal leadership convention. This began a trend of high turnover among permanent Liberal leaders, in contrast to their predecessors who usually served over two or more elections, including Pierre Trudeau and Jean Chrétien who each led for over a decade.

At the Liberal convention in Montreal, Martin was officially neutral in the contest. The party's tribute to Martin was hosted by former Olympian Mark Tewksbury. Martin's press secretary denied that the tribute was low key due to the Sponsorship Scandal and lingering bitterness inside the party, saying that the former prime minister wanted a simple evening. In his farewell speech, Martin paid homage to Chrétien, though the latter was not present for the event, and urged the Liberals to emerge united from the convention. Stéphane Dion was elected Liberal leader from a field of eight candidates.

For his last years of public office after resigning as Prime Minister, Martin was a backbencher, devoting his time to projects related to improving educational opportunities for Aboriginals (The Martin Aboriginal Education Initiative), and protecting the Congo Basin rain forest. In the 2008 federal election, Martin did not run for re-election to Parliament.

Retirement (2008–present)
CTV in November 2008 reported that Martin would be a member of a four-person council of economic advisers to a coalition government formed by the Liberals and the NDP if they succeed in toppling the Harper government. However, the proposed coalition dissolved as outgoing Liberal leader Stéphane Dion was immediately forced out and replaced by Michael Ignatieff, who quickly distanced the party from the coalition.

Martin published his memoirs, entitled Hell Or High Water: My Life In And Out of Politics, in late 2008. The book, published by McClelland & Stewart, draws heavily upon interviews conducted by Sean Conway, a former Ontario Liberal provincial cabinet minister, which were carried out for the Library and Archives Canada.

Martin was asked by Kofi Annan (at that time Secretary General of the United Nations), Gordon Brown (then Prime Minister of the United Kingdom), and other international politicians and diplomats to help African countries develop their economic potential.

In 2009, Martin was co-chair of the Congo Basin Forest Fund, along with Nobel Peace Prize Laureate Professor Wangari Maathai, to address global warming and poverty issues in a ten-nation region in Africa.

In September 2022, Martin attended Elizabeth II's state funeral, along with other former Canadian prime ministers.

Since his retirement from active Canadian politics, Martin has been an adviser to the International Monetary Fund, and to the Coalition for Dialogue on Africa. He also works with the Martin Family Initiative, which assists First Nations youth. He lives in Knowlton Québec and is an enthusiastic member of the Brome Lake Golf club.

Honours
100px

 Prenominal title "The Honourable" and postnominal "PC", for life upon being made a member of the Queen's Privy Council for Canada, November 4, 1993
 Upgraded prenominal title "The Right Honourable", for life upon becoming Prime Minister, December 12, 2003

The CSL vessel Rt. Hon. Paul E. Martin is named for him.

Honorary degrees

Electoral record

See also 

 List of prime ministers of Canada

References

Further reading

Archives

Bibliography

 Gray, John.    Paul Martin, 2003.
 Jeffrey, Brooke.  Divided Loyalties: The Liberal Party of Canada, 1984 – 2008 (University of Toronto Press. 2010) 
 Wilson-Smith, Anthony; Greenspon, Edward (1996). Double Vision: The Inside Story of the Liberals in Power. Doubleday Canada. .

External links

 The Right Honourable Paul Martin
 
 "Prime Minister Paul Martin says he would use the Constitution's notwithstanding clause".
 CBC Digital Archives – Paul Martin: Prime Minister in Waiting
 Paul Edgar Philippe Martin by Steven Azzi and Norman Hillmer 
 "Does Canada's former prime minister hold the key to reducing Britain's budget deficit?" The Guardian January 12, 2009
 
 The Right Honourable Paul Martin, P.C., C.C., Q.C. | The Governor General of Canada
 

|-

|-

 
1938 births
20th-century Canadian businesspeople
21st-century Canadian non-fiction writers
21st-century memoirists
Anglophone Quebec people
Businesspeople from Montreal
Businesspeople from Ottawa
Canadian businesspeople in shipping
Canadian chief executives
Canadian corporate directors
Canadian lawyers
Canadian memoirists
Canadian Ministers of Finance
Canadian people of French descent
Canadian people of Irish descent
Canadian people of Scottish descent
Canadian politicians with disabilities
Canadian Roman Catholics
Canada Steamship Lines people
Companions of the Order of Canada
Franco-Ontarian people
Lawyers in Ontario
Leaders of the Liberal Party of Canada
Liberal Party of Canada MPs
Living people
Paul
Members of the 26th Canadian Ministry
Members of the 27th Canadian Ministry
Members of the House of Commons of Canada from Quebec
Members of the King's Privy Council for Canada
People with polio
People from LaSalle, Quebec
Politicians from Montreal
Politicians from Ottawa
Politicians from Windsor, Ontario
Prime Ministers of Canada
University of Toronto alumni
University of Toronto Faculty of Law alumni
Writers from Montreal
Writers from Ottawa
Writers from Windsor, Ontario
University of Ottawa alumni
People named in the Paradise Papers